Edward Stone may refer to:

 Edward Stone (baseball) (1909–1983), American Negro league baseball player
 Edward Stone (natural philosopher) (1702–1768), English cleric and discoverer of active ingredient in aspirin
 Edward James Stone (1831–1897), British astronomer, president of the Royal Astronomical Society 1882–1884
 Edward Albert Stone (1844–1920), Australian judge, chief justice in Western Australia
 Edward Giles Stone (1873–1947), Australian engineer working with reinforced concrete and manufacturing cement
 Edward Durell Stone (1902–1978), American modernist architect
 Edward C. Stone or Ed Stone (born 1936), American astronomer
 Edward R. Stone (died 2012), American swimmer and diver, later an educator
 Edward Daniel Stone (1832–1916), deacon, classical scholar and schoolmaster at Eton College
 Edward Durell Stone Jr. (1932–2009), American landscape architect

See also 
Edwardstone, a village in Suffolk, England